Pel-Air Aviation Pty Ltd (trading as Pel-Air) is an airline based in Mascot, Sydney, Australia. It is a wholly owned subsidiary of Regional Express Holdings, which also owns Australian airline Rex Airlines.

Pel-Air specialises in air charter and ad hoc services, operating executive charter services throughout Australasia, as well as a freight service. It also operates medevac and government support services with its fleet of Westwind aircraft. Its main bases are Brisbane Airport , Adelaide Airport, Sydney Airport and Essendon Airport.

History 

The company was founded in 1984 and the following year acquired its first Israel Aircraft Industries (IAI) Westwind aircraft. In January 1989 it commenced scheduled passenger-carrying operations in Western Australia via subsidiary company Qwestair, initially with a leased Beech 200 Super King Air flying between Perth and Telfer. A Westwind replaced the King Air in March of that year, and a Cessna 310 was added in January 1992 to operate between Port Hedland and Telfer via Marble Bar and Woodie Woodie. Qwestair ceased operations in November 1995 after the Perth-Telfer route was awarded to another company, and the two Westwinds then in use returned to  operations.

Also in 1995 Pel-Air took over Newcastle Aviation, an operator of Fairchild Metro III, and leased Metro II and Mitsubishi MU-2 freighters. Following the takeover the Mitsubishis and Metro IIs were handed back to their owners and the Metro III fleet was expanded. In 1996  won a contract to provide support to the Royal Australian Navy, resulting in further expansion of the fleet with the acquisition of four Learjets. In 1997  acquired several Metro II aircraft and on-sold them to the Royal Australian Air Force for use as training aids at RAAF Base Wagga near Wagga Wagga. In 2003 the company introduced a new type into its fleet when it took delivery of a leased Beechcraft 1900C freighter. The type proved to be more expensive to operate than the Metro III and the two aircraft in the fleet were handed back to their lessors.

In 2005 another new type was added to the fleet when the company placed an Embraer EMB-120ER Brasilia freighter into service, for use on nightly flights between Sydney and Brisbane carrying Fairfax Media newspapers. Also in 2005 it was announced that  would be purchased in stages by Regional Express Holdings; the company becoming a wholly owned subsidiary in mid-2007.

In June 2008 it was announced that a Pel-Air Westwind II would be based at Perth Airport for use as an air ambulance in conjunction with CareFlight. This service was withdrawn in June 2009.

In late 2008 the company added another new type to the fleet, when it took delivery of two Saab 340A freighters, previously operated in passenger service with the parent company's other airline subsidiary Regional Express Airlines. A third Saab 340 was converted to a freighter and transferred from Regional Express a year later.

In February 2009 Pel-Air began fly-in fly-out operations from Townsville Airport on behalf of Barrick Gold, after the previous operator MacAir Airlines collapsed; using Saab 340Bs of sister airline Rex to provide the service. Fly-in fly-out operations expanded later that year when flights from Adelaide Airport on behalf of Iluka Resources commenced in August under a three-year contract.

In April 2009 Regional Express Holdings announced that due to the cancellation of a number of contracts it would cease all scheduled Metro III freight operations at the end of May. Remaining scheduled freight operations would be conducted using the Saab 340As. Also in April Regional Express Holdings launched RexJet Executive Charter as a division of Pel-Air, in a rebranding and expansion of the group's existing passenger air charter business.

In July 2009 the parent company announced that Pel-Air had been named as preferred tenderer for the provision of air ambulance services in Victoria. The company took over from the previous operator, the Royal Flying Doctor Service of Australia, in mid-2011.

In February 2020 Regional Express announced Pel-Air will be providing Air Ambulance services on behalf of New South Wales Ambulance, placing an order with Beechcraft for five King Air 350 aircraft. Pel-Air further announced the procurement of 2 Pilatus PC-24 aircraft to be introduced into NSW ambulance service from the second half of 2023. Pel-Air will take over from the previous operator, the Royal Flying Doctor Service of Australia, in January 2022 on a 10-year contract.

Fleet 

As of September 2021 the Pel-Air fleet consists of the following aircraft:

4 Hawker Beechcraft B200C King Air- Ambulance Victoria
5 Hawker Beechcraft B350 King Air- Ambulance NSW
3 IAI 1124 Westwind
1 IAI 1124A Westwind II
3 Saab 340AF

Previously operated
 Beechcraft 1900C
 Embraer EMB-120ER Brasilia
 Fairchild SA-227AC Metro III
 Fairchild SA-227AT Expediter
Gates Learjet 35A
Gates Learjet 36
Gates Learjet 36A

Incidents and accidents
On 10 October 1985 one of the company's Westwind aircraft crashed into the sea off Sydney after departing Sydney Airport on a flight to Brisbane; the two crewmembers were killed.
On 27 April 1995 the company suffered a second fatal Westwind crash when one of its aircraft hit a hill on approach to Alice Springs Airport, killing the three occupants.
On 18 November 2009 a third Westwind, a 1124A Westwind II, was written-off near Norfolk Island during an air ambulance flight from Apia to Melbourne on behalf of CareFlight. The aircraft was scheduled to land at Norfolk Island to refuel but weather conditions there had deteriorated while it was en route. After several failed landing attempts the crew successfully ditched in open sea in darkness and bad weather. All six occupants were rescued.

See also
List of airlines of Australia

References

External links

 Pel-Air

Airlines established in 1984
Australian companies established in 1984
Airlines of Australia
Air ambulance services
Charter airlines of Australia